Darvishan Sarbisheh (also Romanized as Darvīshān Sarbīsheh; also known as Darvīshān, Qaryeh-ye Darvīshān and Qaryeh-ye Darvishān) is a village in Zirtang Rural District, Kunani District, Kuhdasht County, Lorestan Province, Iran. At the 2006 census, its population was 107, in 20 families.

References 

Towns and villages in Kuhdasht County